Gaston Étienne Ghislaine Reiff (24 February 1921 – 6 May 1992) was a Belgian runner. He competed at the 1948 and 1952 Olympics in the 5000 m event and won it in 1948, defeating Emil Zátopek in the final and becoming the first Belgian track and field athlete to win an Olympic title. He lost to Zátopek at the 1950 European Championships, placing third.

Reiff competed in boxing and football before changing to athletics. Besides his Olympic gold medal he set world records in the 2000 m, 3000 m and 2 miles and won 24 national titles; in 1951 he held Belgian records on distances ranging from 1000 m to 10000 m. A street in Braine-l'Alleud and the town's stadium are named after Reiff in his home town of Braine-l'Alleud.

References

1921 births
1992 deaths
People from Braine-l'Alleud
Belgian male middle-distance runners
Belgian male long-distance runners
Olympic athletes of Belgium
Athletes (track and field) at the 1948 Summer Olympics
Athletes (track and field) at the 1952 Summer Olympics
Olympic gold medalists for Belgium
World record setters in athletics (track and field)

European Athletics Championships medalists
Sportspeople from Walloon Brabant
Medalists at the 1948 Summer Olympics
Olympic gold medalists in athletics (track and field)